Demon in the Blood is a 1964 Argentine film directed by René Mugica.

Cast

External links
 

1964 films
1960s Spanish-language films
Argentine black-and-white films
Argentine horror films
Films directed by René Múgica
1960s Argentine films